The 2010 Ju-Jitsu World Championship were the 9th edition of the Ju-Jitsu World Championships, and were held in Saint Petersburg, Russia from November 27 to November 28, 2010.

Schedule 
27.11.2010 – Men's and Women's Fighting System, Men's and Women's Duo System – Classic
28.11.2010 – Men's and Women's Fighting System, Mixed Duo System – Classic

European Ju-Jitsu

Fighting System

Men's events

Women's events

Duo System

Duo Classic events

Links

References

External links
Official results (PDF)